Georg Waitz (7 September 1891 – 14 November 1948) was a Norwegian footballer. He played in one match for the Norway national football team in 1912.

References

External links
 

1891 births
1948 deaths
Norwegian footballers
Norway international footballers
Place of birth missing
Association footballers not categorized by position